The individual freestyle dressage competition at the 2006 FEI World Equestrian Games was held between August 22 and August 26, 2006.

Medalists

Complete results

Round 1
The first round of the individual freestyle dressage competition was held on August 22 and August 23, 2006.

Debbie McDonald withdrew prior to the final due to a veterinary concern with her horse, Brentina.

Round 2
The second round of the individual freestyle dressage competition was held on August 25, 2006. This round was also used as the final for the individual special competition.

Because of a ruling that only three competitors from each nation may compete, both Hubertus Schmidt of Germany and Laurens van Lieren of the Netherlands were unable to compete in the final, allowing Christian Pläge of Switzerland and Emma Hindle of the United Kingdom to take their places.

Final
The final round of the individual freestyle dressage competition was held on August 26, 2006.

References

External links
Official list of competitors
Official results
Round 1
Round 2
Final

Dressage